Guillaume Le Floch (born 16 February 1985 in Saint-Brieuc) is a French athlete.

Palmares

2005
1st, stage 2a, Kreiz Breizh

2006
2nd, French national road race championship (U23)
2nd, GP Plouay (U23)

2007
1st, Circuit de Morbihan

References

External links
 Profile on team website
 

French male cyclists
Sportspeople from Saint-Brieuc
1985 births
Living people
Cyclists from Brittany